Kay Christopher (June 3, 1926 – June 18, 2012) was an American actress and model.

Early life and career 
Christopher was born into a middle-class family. Her father was a newspaper editor and her mother a librarian. She was educated at New Rochelle High School from which she graduated in 1944. Christopher was raised as a Methodist. She began her career as a pin-up model, and was so successful that she received the title of "Miss Photo Flash 1945". Following this success, she received a film contract with RKO Radio Pictures, and made her screen debut in the uncredited role of a bridesmaid to Laraine Day in The Locket (1946).

She then had the lead role of Tess Trueheart in Dick Tracy's Dilemma (1947), opposite Ralph Byrd. She later had turns in such motion pictures as Desperate (1947), I Cheated the Law (1949), If You Knew Susie (1949), Code of the Silver Sage (1950), and Gasoline Alley (1951). She also made TV appearances on such programs as Lux Video Theatre and had a recurring role on Doctor I.Q. in the mid-1950s. She retired from acting and modeling in 1954, to focus on her marriage to Donald Griffin, although she did come out of retirement once in 1958 for an appearance on The Perry Como Show. A Democrat, she supported the campaign of Adlai Stevenson during the 1952 presidential election.

Death
 
In the mid-1970s, she was diagnosed with diabetes, and died from complications of the disease on June 18, 2012. She was interred at Williamsburg Memorial Park in Williamsburg, Virginia.

Selected filmography
 Gasoline Alley (1951)
 Corky of Gasoline Alley (1951)

References

External links

 

1926 births
2012 deaths
20th-century American actresses
Actresses from New Rochelle, New York
Female models from New York (state)
American film actresses
American television actresses
Burials in Virginia
Deaths from diabetes
Methodists from New York (state)
New York (state) Democrats
Virginia Democrats
California Democrats
New Rochelle High School alumni